Boris Ivanovich Krasin ( (Ishim 1846 - June 23 (July 6)1901)) was policeman in Imperial Russia. He served a police chief in Kurgan and Tyumen. Krasin gave access to the jail in Tyumen to the American explorer, George Kennan. Before his trip to Russia, Kennan had been a supporter of the Tsarist regime, but what he encountered in the jail contributed to his subsequent condemnation of Tsarism.

Family life
Boris was the son of a solicitor Ivan Vasilyevich Krasin, a Titular Councillor - a formal rank in the Imperial Table of Ranks. He married Antonina Grigorievna Kropanina, the youngest daughter of a prominent local merchant. Together they had five children:
 Leonid Krasin (1870–1926)): Soviet politician, engineer, social entrepreneur, Bolshevik revolutionary politician and a Soviet diplomat
 Herman Krasin (1871 - 1947): the first director of the State Institute of Structures (1927-1929)
 Alexander Borisovich (1874-1909), engineer
 Boris Krasin (1884–1936): composer and Proletkult activist

References

1846 births
1901 deaths